Australiophilus is a genus of two species of centipedes, in the family Zelanophilidae, which are found in the Australasian region. It was described by German myriapodologist Karl Wilhelm Verhoeff in 1925.

Species
Valid species:
 Australiophilus ferrugineus (Hutton, 1877)
 Australiophilus longissimus Verhoeff, 1925

References

 

 
 
Centipede genera
Animals described in 1925
Taxa named by Karl Wilhelm Verhoeff